Chamaelaucium ciliatum is a member of the family Myrtaceae endemic to Western Australia.

It blooms between January and December  producing white flowers.

Found in the southern Wheatbelt, Great Southern and Goldfields-Esperance regions of Western Australia where it grows in many soil types.

References

ciliatum
Plants described in 1819
Taxa named by René Louiche Desfontaines